What Is Mathematics? is a mathematics book written by Richard Courant and Herbert Robbins, published in England by Oxford University Press. It is an introduction to mathematics, intended both for the mathematics student and for the general public.

First published in 1941, it discusses number theory, geometry, topology and calculus. A second edition was published in 1996 with an additional chapter on recent progress in mathematics, written by Ian Stewart.

Authorship

The book was based on Courant's course material. Although Robbins assisted in writing a large part of the book, he had to fight for authorship. Nevertheless, Courant alone held the copyright for the book. This resulted in Robbins receiving a smaller share of the royalties.

Title
Michael Katehakis remembers Robbins' interest in the literature and Tolstoy in particular and he is convinced that the title of the book is most likely due to Robbins, who was inspired by the title of the essay What Is Art? by Leo Tolstoy. Robbins did the same in the book Great Expectations: The Theory of Optimal Stopping he co-authored with Yuan-Shih Chow and David Siegmund, where one can not miss the connection with the title of the novel Great Expectations by Charles Dickens.

According to Constance Reid, Courant finalized the title after a conversation with Thomas Mann.

Translations
The first Russian translation Что такое математика? was published in 1947; there were 5 translations since then, the last one in 2010.
The first Italian translation, Che cos'è la matematica?, was published in 1950. А translation of the second edition was issued in 2000.
The first German translation Was ist Mathematik? by Iris Runge was published in 1962.
A Spanish translation of the second edition, ¿Qué Son Las Matemáticas?, was published in 2002.
The first Bulgarian translation, Що е математика?, was published in 1967. А second translation appeared in 1985.
The first Romanian translation, Ce este matematica?, was published in 1969.
The first Polish translation, Co to jest matematyka, was published in 1959. А second translation appeared in 1967. А translation of the second edition was published in 1998.
The first Hungarian translation, Mi a matematika?, was published in 1966.
The first Serbian translation, Šta je matematika?, was published in 1973.
The first Japanese translation, was published in 1966. А translation of the second edition was published in 2001.
A Korean translation of the second edition, was published in 2000.
A Portuguese translation of the second edition, O que é matemática?, was published in 2000.

Reviews 
 What is Mathematics? An Elementary Approach to Ideas and Methods, book review by Brian E. Blank, Notices of the American Mathematical Society 48, #11 (December 2001), pp. 1325–1330
 What is Mathematics?, book review by Leonard Gillman, The American Mathematical Monthly 105, #5 (May 1998), pp. 485–488.

Editions 
  Reprinted several times with a few corrections of minor errors and misprints as a "Second Edition" in 1943, as a "Third Edition" in 1945, as a "Fourth Edition" in 1947", as "Ninth Printing" in 1958 and as "Tenth Printing" in 1960, and in 1978.
 (1996) 2nd edition, with additional material by Ian Stewart. New York: Oxford University Press. .
  French translation of the second English edition by Marie Anglade and Karine Py.
  Spanish translation of the second English edition.
  (first Italian translation, from the 1945 English edition)
  (based on the previous Eianudi's edition)
  (Vietnamese translation by Hàn Liên Hải from the Russian edition)
  (Italian translation of the second English edition)

References 

 Herbert Robbins, Great Expectations: The Theory of Optimal Stopping, with Y. S. Chow and David Siegmund. Boston: Houghton Mifflin, 1971.

Books by Ian Stewart (mathematician)
Mathematics textbooks
1941 non-fiction books